

Notes

References

 
1856 establishments in Australia